Maverick is a populated place situated in Apache County, Arizona, United States.

References

External links
 Maverick – ghosttowns.com

Populated places in Apache County, Arizona
Ghost towns in Arizona